La Chapelle-Chaussée is a commune in the Ille-et-Vilaine department of Brittany in north-western France.

Population
Inhabitants of La Chapelle-Chaussée are called Chapellois in French.

Gallery

See also
Communes of the Ille-et-Vilaine department

References

External links

Official website 

Mayors of Ille-et-Vilaine Association 

Communes of Ille-et-Vilaine